The team routine competition at the 1973 World Aquatics Championships was held on 4 September 1973.

Results
Green denotes finalists

References
Official Results

Team routine